Bulgaria elected its members of the European Parliament in a by-election on 20 May 2007. It was the country's first European election, having joined the Union on 1 January of that year. The country still had 18 MEPs, no change from before the election. Until Bulgaria could hold these elections, the country was represented by MEPs appointed by the National Assembly.

The top two parties – GERB and Bulgarian Socialist Party (BSP) – won 5 seats each, followed by the Movement for Rights and Freedoms (DPS) with four, Ataka with three, and National Movement Simeon II (NDSV) with one. Voter turnout was 28.6%.

It was considered likely that the result of the election would cause a major political crisis in Bulgaria, due to the expected weak results of the National Movement.

Controversially, the eligible voters were limited to citizens of Bulgaria and the EU with their permanent and current address within the Union and a minimum of 60 days of the last three months before the elections spent within its borders. Because of this requirement, 232,800 people were rendered ineligible to vote, 185,000 of whom were Turkish Bulgarians resident in Turkey.

Contesting parties
The following parties contested the elections:
 Coalition of the Bulgarian Agrarian People's Union
 Communist Party of Bulgaria
 Coalition of Bulgarian Social Democrats (Party of Bulgarian Social Democrats, Political Movement "Social Democrats")
 GERB
 Civil Union for New Bulgaria
 Democrats for a Strong Bulgaria
 European Socialists Platform (Bulgarian Socialist Party, Movement for Social Humanism)
 Green Party of Bulgaria
 Movement for Rights and Freedoms
 National Movement Simeon II
 Attack
 Order, Law and Justice
 Union of the Democratic Forces
 Union of Free Democrats
 two independents

The People's First Movement had registered to contest the election, but were refused by the Central Electoral Commission.

The five Bulgarian nurses sentenced to death and the Bulgarian doctor who received a lighter sentence in the HIV trial in Libya were slated to stand as the six leading candidates on the list of the populist Order, Law and Justice Party – to put pressure on Libya to release the nurses and to postpone their execution because of the immunity they would have as MEPs. They were refused by the Central Electoral Commission, however, as they did not meet the residency requirements.

Pre-election situation
18 MEPs were appointed by Bulgaria to serve as observers in the Parliament before the country joined on 1 January 2007. Those observers then functioned as Bulgaria's appointed delegation to the European Parliament until elections were held on 20 May 2007. The breakdown of parties and their European Parliament political groups for the period 1 January 2007 to 20 May 2007 was as follows:

Results
The official results were announced by the Central Electoral Commission on 21 May. According to the official data, the winner of the elections was GERB, followed by a small margin by the Bulgarian Socialist Party and the Movement for Rights and Freedoms, with the distance between the third and the first being less than 1.5%. The voter turnout was 28.6%.

Elected MEPs
According to the election results, the following 18 candidates were elected as Bulgarian Members of the European Parliament:

 GERB (5)
 Dushana Zdravkova
 Vladimir Uruchev
 Nickolay Mladenov
 Petya Stavreva
 Rumyana Zheleva
 Bulgarian Socialist Party (5)
 Kristian Vigenin
 Iliyana Yotova
 Atanas Paparizov
 Marusya Lyubenova
 Evgeni Kirilov
 Movement for Rights and Freedoms (4)
 Filiz Husmenova
 Mariela Baeva
 Metin Kazak
 Vladko Panayotov
 Attack (3)
 Dimitar Stoyanov
 Slavcho Binev
 Desislav Chukolov
 National Movement Simeon II (1)
 Bilyana Raeva

See also
 Elections in Bulgaria
 Elections in the European Union
 2007 European Parliament election
 2007 European Parliament election in Romania
 Bulgaria (European Parliament constituency)

References

External links
 Weak turnout marks European elections in Bulgaria euractiv.com 21/05/07
 Bulgaria's First European Vote novinite.com
 Bulgaria elects new MEPs amid corruption worries EUobserver 21/05/07
 Results izbori2007.eu (Bulgarian)
 Seats news.ibox.bg (Bulgarian)

Bulgaria
European Parliament elections in Bulgaria
2007 elections in Bulgaria
May 2007 events in Europe